The Ultra Zionists is a British documentary that was televised on 3 February 2011. Louis Theroux investigates ultra-nationalist Jewish settlers in East Jerusalem, Hebron and Nablus. The documentary also follows Theroux as he tours the Muslim quarter of Jerusalem with Daniel Luria of the Ateret Cohanim Zionist Movement.

In The Ultra Zionists, Louis Theroux interviews a small group of ultra-nationalist Israelis at the border of advancing settlements in the West Bank.

Along the way, he discovers a group of Jewish people who consider it a religious imperative for them to settle in some of the most widely disputed areas of East Jerusalem, especially areas with a spiritual significance set down in the Bible. The areas they choose to settle, though, are declared illegal even by Israeli officials. One such individual is Daniel, a hardline nationalist from Australia, who works for an organization that provides homes for Jews in the overwhelmingly Palestinian East Jerusalem. Israel's annexations of this area are not recognized by any other countries.

References

External links

Louis Theroux's BBC Two specials
BBC television documentaries
2011 in British television
Documentary films about Jews and Judaism
Documentary films about the Israeli–Palestinian conflict
Religious Zionism
Television episodes set in Israel
BBC travel television series